Golden Swan-True American, also known as the Caola Building, is located in Trenton, Mercer County, New Jersey, United States. The building was built in 1861 and was added to the National Register of Historic Places on April 30, 2008.

See also
National Register of Historic Places listings in Mercer County, New Jersey

References

Commercial buildings on the National Register of Historic Places in New Jersey
Buildings and structures completed in 1861
Buildings and structures in Trenton, New Jersey
National Register of Historic Places in Trenton, New Jersey
1861 establishments in New Jersey
New Jersey Register of Historic Places